Tracey Melesko is a paralympic athlete from Canada competing mainly in category T20 sprint and long jump events.

Tracey competed in the 1996 Summer Paralympics winning silvers in both her events, the 200m and long jump for mentally disabled people.  In 2000 she competed in the 100m as well as the 200m and long jump and won a bronze medal in the 200m T20 class.

References

Paralympic track and field athletes of Canada
Athletes (track and field) at the 1996 Summer Paralympics
Athletes (track and field) at the 2000 Summer Paralympics
Paralympic silver medalists for Canada
Paralympic bronze medalists for Canada
Living people
Medalists at the 1996 Summer Paralympics
Medalists at the 2000 Summer Paralympics
Competitors in athletics with intellectual disability
Year of birth missing (living people)
Paralympic medalists in athletics (track and field)